The Swimming Pool at the Olimpiysky Sports Complex was a covered swimming centre in Moscow, Russia. The venue, built for the 1980 Summer Olympics, makes up the Olimpiysky Sports Complex architectural ensemble together with the Olimpiysky Arena. During the Olympics, it hosted the swimming, diving, water polo, and the swimming part of the modern pentathlon events. It also hosted 2002 Short Course World Championships. The venue consists of a 50x25x2,25m swimming pool (with capacity for 7,500 spectators), separated by an acoustic partition from the 35x25x6 m diving pool (with capacity for 4,500 spectators).

See also
Olympic Pool at the Luzhniki Olympic Complex

References

External links
  Official website of the Olympiisky Sports Complex

Sports venues in Moscow
Indoor arenas built in the Soviet Union
Indoor arenas in Russia
Venues of the 1980 Summer Olympics
Olympic diving venues
Olympic modern pentathlon venues
Olympic swimming venues
Olympic water polo venues
Sports venue
Venues of the Friendship Games
Sports venues demolished in 2020
Defunct sports venues in Russia
Demolished buildings and structures in Moscow
Demolished sports venues